Acanthoprasium is a genus in the family Lamiaceae which is found in Cyprus, Italy, France. It contains the species Acanthoprasium frutescens (L.) Spenn., Acanthoprasium integrifolium (Benth.) Ryding.

References

Lamiaceae
Lamiaceae genera